Infesta is a civil parish in the municipality of Paredes de Coura, Portugal. The population in 2011 was 450, in an area of 5.89 km².

References

Freguesias of Paredes de Coura